Matthew or Matt Smith may refer to:

Artists
Matthew Smith (painter) (1879–1959), British painter 
Matthew Dow Smith, American comic book artist
Matt Smith (comics editor) (born 1972), British comic book editor
Matt Smith (illustrator), American children's magazine illustrator and album cover artist

Entertainers
Matt Smith (born 1982), English actor
Matt Smith (drummer), jazz percussionist
Matt Smith (guitarist), guitarist for the Australian band Thirsty Merc
Matt Smith (musician), guitar player for the glam rock band Paris
Matt "Money" Smith (born 1973), Southern California radio personality
Matt Smith (The Real World) (born 1978), participant in The Real World
Matt Smith (TV reporter), entertainment correspondent

Politics
Matthew Smith (Pennsylvania statesman) (1734–1794), Vice-President (Lt. Gov.) of Pennsylvania
Matthew H. Smith (born 1972), member of the Pennsylvania State Senate
Matthew Smith (colonial secretary) (1836–1887), former acting Colonial Secretary of Western Australia
Matt Smith (Australian politician) (born 1978), member of the Tasmanian state parliament
Matthew Smith (Canadian politician) (1842–1909), farmer, hotel owner and political figure in Prince Edward Island, Canada
Matthew Smith (Irish politician) (died 1955), Irish Fianna Fáil politician

Sports

Association football
Mattha Smith (1897–1953), Scottish footballer
Matt Smith (soccer, born 1982), English-born Australian professional soccer player
Matt Smith (footballer, born 1989), English professional footballer for Salford City
Matty Smith (footballer, born 1997), Scottish footballer with Dundee United
Matthew Smith (footballer, born 1999),  Wales international footballer
Matt Smith (footballer, born 2000), English footballer for Arsenal and Doncaster Rovers

Rugby
Matt Smith (rugby union, born 1985), rugby union player with Leicester Tigers
Matty Smith (rugby league) (born 1987), English rugby league player for Wigan Warriors
Matt Smith (rugby union, born 1989), rugby union player with Cornish Pirates
Matt Smith (rugby union, born 1996), rugby union player with Glasgow Warriors

Other sports
Matt Smith (broadcaster) (born 1967), BT Sport presenter
Matthew Smith (field hockey) (born 1973), Australian field hockey player
Matthew Smith (rower) (born 1977), American rower
Matt Smith (baseball) (born 1979), American baseball pitcher
Matthew Smith (cricketer) (born 1990), English cricketer
Matt Smith (duathlete) (born 1996), Australian duathlete

Other persons
Matthew Smith, author of JFK: The Second Plot
Matthew Smith (games programmer) (born 1966), British computer game programmer
Matthew Smith (labor activist) (1893-1958), British-American labor organizer
Matthew Smith (spy), 17th-century spy and the author of Memoirs of Secret Service
Matthew Smith, model, contestant in America's Next Top Model